Dominic Reinold (born 7 January 1989) is a German former professional footballer who played as a forward.

College and amateur career
Reinold moved to the United States to play college soccer at Fairleigh Dickinson University in 2009.  In his freshman year, Reinold made 18 appearances and led his team with 12 goals and also recorded four assists for a total of 28 points.  In his sophomore year, he finished with nine goals and four assists for a total of 22 points.

During his two years at Fairleigh Dickinson, Reinold was named to the First Team All-Northeast Conference in 2009 and 2010 and National Soccer Coaches Association of America Second Team All-North Atlantic Region in 2010.  He was also named 2009 Northeast Conference Rookie of the Year.

Reinold also spent two seasons with the New Jersey Rangers in the USL Premier Development League.

Professional
On 21 July 2011, after a successful trial, Reinold signed a two-year contract with Beira-Mar, forgoing his final two years of eligibility with Fairleigh Dickinson.  He made his professional debut on 14 August, coming on as a sub for Zhang Chengdong in a 0–0 draw against Marítimo.

References

External links
 
 FDU Knights bio

1989 births
Living people
German footballers
Association football forwards
USL League Two players
Primeira Liga players
Liga Portugal 2 players
Fairleigh Dickinson Knights men's soccer players
NJ-LUSO Parma players
S.C. Beira-Mar players
S.C. Covilhã players
German expatriate footballers
German expatriate sportspeople in the United States
Expatriate soccer players in the United States
German expatriate sportspeople in Portugal
Expatriate footballers in Portugal